Phtheochroa pecosana is a species of moth of the family Tortricidae. It is found in the United States , where it has been recorded from Arizona, California, Colorado and New Mexico.

References

Moths described in 1907
Phtheochroa